Mohamed Haioun (born 27 March 1969) is an Algerian boxer. He competed in the men's light flyweight event at the 1992 Summer Olympics.

References

External links
 

1969 births
Living people
Algerian male boxers
Olympic boxers of Algeria
Boxers at the 1992 Summer Olympics
Place of birth missing (living people)
Light-flyweight boxers
21st-century Algerian people